The Aniche Mining Company (compagnie des mines d'Aniche) was a French company that operated coal mines in the Nord-Pas de Calais.  The company was founded in 1773 and became part of the Groupe de Douia in 1946.  Prior to World War II the Aniche Mining Company produced over 3 million tons of coal per year, and employed 15,000 workers.

References 

Coal companies of France